Asagraea may refer to:

 Asagraea Baill., 1870, a genus in the family Fabaceae
 Asagraea Lindl., 1839, a genus in the family Melanthiaceae